Bratton Castle (also known as Bratton Camp) is a bivallate (two ramparts) Iron Age built hill fort on Bratton Down, at the western edge of the Salisbury Plain escarpment.

The Westbury White Horse, a hill figure first documented in 1742, lies on the west side of the hill fort.

Background

Hill forts developed in the Late Bronze and Early Iron Age, roughly the start of the first millennium BC. The reason for their emergence in Britain, and their purpose, has been a subject of debate. It has been argued that they could have been military sites constructed in response to invasion from continental Europe, sites built by invaders, or a military reaction to social tensions caused by an increasing population and consequent pressure on agriculture. The dominant view since the 1960s has been that the increasing use of iron led to social changes in Britain. Deposits of iron ore were located in different places to the tin and copper ore necessary to make bronze, and as a result trading patterns shifted and the old elites lost their economic and social status. Power passed into the hands of a new group of people. Archaeologist Barry Cunliffe believes that population increase still played a role and has stated "[the forts] provided defensive possibilities for the community at those times when the stress [of an increasing population] burst out into open warfare. But I wouldn't see them as having been built because there was a state of war. They would be functional as defensive strongholds when there were tensions and undoubtedly some of them were attacked and destroyed, but this was not the only, or even the most significant, factor in their construction".

Description

The northern half of the east side crosses the head of a re-entrant valley where the outer rampart and ditch have been largely destroyed by quarrying or landslips and the construction of a farm track. The short north east side straddles a narrow steep-sided ridge up which runs the Port Way. This passes through a possible original entrance, at which point the two ramparts have separated to form a small annexe, the outer ditch of which has, in places, been removed by quarrying. Quarrying has, in the past, also taken place within parts of the interior of the fort.

Archaeology
The hill fort was one of the sites excavated by Jeffery Whittaker prior to 1775, which is thought to have been one of the earliest archaeological excavations to have taken place in Wiltshire. The excavation was poorly documented but it is believed that Roman and Saxon coins were found within the vicinity of the fort. Later excavations were carried out by William Cunnington and Sir Richard Colt Hoare. Notably three barrows within and around the castle were excavated and recorded

Bratton G1 
A Long Barrow, within which was found two primary cremations on a platform with a pile of pebble stones and one chalk bead covered with 'vegetable earth', intermixed with pottery and animal bones at four and five feet deep. Three secondary inhumations were found near the top.

Bratton G2 
A Bowl barrow containing two cremation urns, the one placed within the other, and an interment of burnt bones. The large urn was broken in pieces; the small one, containing about three pints was better preserved and is contained within the Wiltshire Heritage Museum. It is described as particular in its shape, having a perforated and projecting handle.

Bratton G8a 
A small round barrow less than one foot high, contained a circular cist with a crouched skeleton, but no relics. The skull is at Cambridge Museum.

Location
The hill has a summit of  AOD. The site and surrounding downs are easily accessible by public footpath.

See also 
List of places in Wiltshire
List of hillforts in England
List of hillforts in Scotland
List of hillforts in Wales

References

External links

Iron Age sites in England
Buildings and structures in Wiltshire
Hill forts in Wiltshire
Archaeological sites in Wiltshire
Bratton, Wiltshire